William Webb Ellis (24 November 1806 – 24 January 1872) was an English Anglican clergyman who, by tradition, has been credited as the inventor of rugby football while a pupil at Rugby School. According to legend, Webb Ellis picked up the ball and ran with it during a school football match in 1823, thus creating the "rugby" style of play. Although the story has become firmly entrenched in the sport's folklore, it is not supported by substantive evidence, and is discounted by most rugby historians as an origin myth.

The Webb Ellis Cup is presented to the winners of the Rugby World Cup.

Biography
William Webb Ellis was born in Salford, Lancashire, the younger of three sons of James Ellis, a cornet in the 7th Dragoon Guards.  The eldest son, James, died aged three and the second son, Thomas, of Dunchurch, Warwickshire, became a surgeon.  Third son William was made a Lieutenant of the 3rd Dragoon Guards in 1809, joining them in Portugal.  William's father James was married for a second time in Exeter in 1804 to Ann, daughter of William Webb, a surgeon, of Alton, Hampshire. His paternal grandfather was from Pontyclun in South Wales, a descendant of the Ellis family of Kiddal Hall, just off the A64 near Potterton, West Riding of Yorkshire.

After his father was killed during the Peninsular War in a cavalry action near Albuera on 1 July 1812, Mrs Ellis, in receipt of an allowance of £30 from His Majesty's Royal Bounty in recognition of her husband's service, decided to move to Rugby, Warwickshire, so that William and his elder brother, Thomas, would receive an education at Rugby School with no cost as a local foundationer (i.e. a pupil living within a radius of 10 miles of the Rugby Clock Tower). He attended the school in Town House from 1816 to 1825 and was recorded as being a good scholar and cricketer, although it was noted that he was "rather inclined to take unfair advantage at cricket". The incident in which William Webb Ellis supposedly caught the ball in his arms during a football match (which was allowed) and ran with it (which was not) is supposed to have happened in the latter half of 1823.

After leaving Rugby in 1826, he went to Brasenose College, Oxford, aged 20. He played cricket for his college, and for Oxford University against Cambridge University in a first-class match in 1827. He graduated with a B.A. in 1829 and received his M.A. in 1831. He entered the Church and became chaplain of St George's Chapel, Albemarle Street, London (closed c.1909), and then rector of St Clement Danes in the Strand. He became well known as a low church evangelical clergyman. In 1855, he became rector of Magdalen Laver in Essex. A picture of him (the only known portrait) appeared in the Illustrated London News in 1854, after he gave a particularly stirring sermon on the subject of the Crimean War.

He never married and died in the south of France in 1872, leaving an estate of £9,000, mostly to various charities. His grave in le cimetière du vieux château at Menton in Alpes Maritimes was rediscovered by Ross McWhirter in 1958, was renovated by the Riviera Hash House Harriers in 2003 and is now maintained by the French Rugby Federation.

Legend

Origin

The sole source of the story of Webb Ellis picking up the ball originates with one Matthew Bloxam, a local antiquarian and former pupil of Rugby. On 10 October 1876, he wrote to The Meteor, the Rugby School magazine, that he had learnt from an unnamed source that the change from a kicking game to a handling game had "...originated with a town boy or foundationer of the name of Ellis, Webb Ellis".

On 22 December 1880, in another letter to The Meteor, Bloxam elaborates on the story:

Bloxam's first account differed from his second one four years later. In his first letter, in 1876, Bloxham claimed that Webb Ellis committed the act in 1824, a time by which Webb Ellis had left Rugby. In his second letter, in 1880, Bloxham put the year as 1823.

1895 investigation
The claim that Webb Ellis invented the game did not surface until four years after his death, and doubts have been raised about the story since 1895, when the Old Rugbeian Society first investigated it. The sub-committee conducting the investigation was "unable to procure any first hand evidence of the occurrence".

Among those giving evidence, Thomas Harris and his brother John, who had left Rugby in 1828 and 1832 respectively (i.e. after the alleged Webb Ellis incident) recalled that handling of the ball was strictly forbidden. Thomas Harris, who requested that he "not [be] quote[d] as an authority", testified that Webb Ellis had been known as someone to take an "unfair advantage at football". John Harris, who would have been aged 10 years at the time of the alleged incident, did not claim to have been a witness to it. Additionally, he stated that he had not heard  the story of Webb Ellis's creation of the game.

Thomas Hughes (author of Tom Brown's Schooldays) was asked to comment on the game as played when he attended the school (1834–1842). He is quoted as saying "In my first year, 1834, running with the ball to get a try by touching down within goal was not absolutely forbidden, but a jury of Rugby boys of that day would almost certainly have found a verdict of 'justifiable homicide' if a boy had been killed in running in."

It has been suggested by Dunning and Sheard (2005) that it was no coincidence that this investigation was conducted in 1895, at a time when divisions within the sport led to the schism: the split into the sports of rugby league and rugby union. Dunning and Sheard suggest that the endorsement of a "reductionist" origin myth by the Rugbeians was an attempt to assert their school's position and authority over a sport that they were losing control of.

Alternative theories

Caid
One theory is that Webb Ellis was playing the ancient Irish game Caid, which was similar to Rugby. His father may have been familiar with this game as he had been stationed in Ireland as a soldier with the Dragoons.

Jem Mackie
An article by Gordon Rayner in The Sunday Telegraph about the origin of Rugby football says that Thomas Hughes told the 1895 investigation that in 1838–1839 a Rugby School boy called Jem Mackie "was the first great runner-in", and that later (in or before 1842) Jem Mackie was expelled from Rugby School for an unspecified incident; in 1845 boys at the school first wrote down an agreed set of rules for the version of football played at Rugby School, which is now rugby football. Gordon Rayner says that the reason for Jem Mackie's expulsion may have damaged Mackie's reputation so much that Bloxam transferred Mackie's part in inventing Rugby football to Webb Ellis, and that a big donation by Bloxam to Rugby School's library may have influenced school official acceptance of this Webb Ellis version. 

Another theory is that Mackie's role may have been disregarded because the committee was seeking to prove Rugby School had invented the game, and thus may have preferred the earliest possible date. England Rugby says that William Webb Ellis's action (if it happened) did not lead to any immediate change in the rules but may well have inspired later imitators, though not Mackie, as Thomas Hughes said the Webb Ellis story had not survived into his own time (1834, which was before Mackie popularised running-in during 1838/39).

Plaque
A plaque, erected in 1895, at Rugby School bears the inscription:

THIS STONE
COMMEMORATES THE EXPLOIT OF
WILLIAM WEBB ELLIS
WHO WITH A FINE DISREGARD FOR THE RULES OF FOOTBALL
AS PLAYED IN HIS TIME
FIRST TOOK THE BALL IN HIS ARMS AND RAN WITH IT
THUS ORIGINATING THE DISTINCTIVE FEATURE OF
THE RUGBY GAME
A.D. 1823

See also
 Abner Doubleday, sometimes apocryphally credited with inventing baseball
 Tom Wills, attended Rugby School and pioneered Australian rules football

References

General

External links
 
 Richard Lindon inventor of the "Oval" ball, the rubber bladder and the Brass Hand pump
 Ron Schuler's Parlour Tricks: Fine Disregard of the Rules
 www.telegraph.co.uk

1806 births
1872 deaths
English people of Welsh descent
Alumni of Brasenose College, Oxford
19th-century English Anglican priests
English cricketers
English cricketers of 1826 to 1863
English expatriates in France
History of rugby league
History of rugby union
World Rugby Hall of Fame inductees
Oxford University cricketers
People educated at Rugby School
People from Rugby, Warwickshire
People from Salford
Rugby football